The Burgas trolleybus system forms part of the public transport network  of the Black Sea city and municipality of Burgas, the fourth most populous city, and the largest and most important port, in Bulgaria.

The system presently comprises two routes.

History

Opened on 25 September 1989, the Burgas trolleybus system was originally operated by ZiU-9 trolleybuses.  Those vehicles have since been replaced by Berna and Volvo trolleybuses acquired second hand from other systems, which in turn were replaced by brand new Škoda 26Tr Solaris trolleybuses in 2014.

Some parts of the original system have been closed down and the overhead wires removed. In the late 2000s only one line was still operating.

However, in 2010 the operator of the system Burgasbus commissioned a second line, T2, which opened in mid-2011. The T2 line created a better connection between the western suburb of Meden Rudnik (Bulgarian: Меден Рудник) and the city centre.

In 2013 Burgas along with Pleven, Stara Zagora and Varna placed a joint order for 100 brand new Škoda 26Tr Solaris trolleybuses financed by a European Union program. Burgas received 22 of them in 2014 and completely replaced the outdated fleet.

Services
As at August 2011, the Burgas trolleybus lines were:

 T1 Burgas Central railway station – Meden Rudnik;
 T2 Meden Rudnik – city centre – Meden Rudnik.

Trolleybus fleet

Current fleet
As of 2014, the Burgas trolleybus fleet consisted of 22 trolleybuses.

 Škoda 26Tr Solaris - 22 units

Past fleet
 ZiU-9 - 20 units (1989-2010);
 Berna 4GTP - 5 units acquired from Winterthur (1999-2014);
 Volvo B58/Hess - 11 units acquired from Lucerne (2008-2014);

See also

Burgas Central railway station
List of trolleybus systems

References

External links

 Municipality of Burgas transport information page
 Images of the Burgas trolleybus system, at railfaneurope.net
 
 

Transport in Burgas
Burgas
Burgas